Baltemar José de Oliveira Brito (born 9 January 1952) is a Brazilian former professional footballer who played as a central defender, and a current coach.

Playing career
Born in Recife, Pernambuco, Brito spent the vast majority of his professional career in Portugal, representing Vitória de Guimarães (no league games played), F.C. Paços de Ferreira (two spells), C.D. Feirense, Rio Ave FC (two stints), Vitória de Setúbal and Varzim SC.

Over the course of eight seasons, he amassed Primeira Liga totals of 197 games and seven goals in representation of all the clubs except Paços, with which he competed solely in the second division. He retired at the end of 1987–88 at the age of 36, after suffering top flight relegation with Varzim.

Coaching career
Brito was in charge of Varzim for two games in his last season as a player, managing two draws. Subsequently, he had two spells as head coach with lowly CA Macedo de Cavaleiros.

In the 2001–02 campaign, at U.D. Leiria, Brito started a link with José Mourinho that would last eight years. The assistant was part of a quartet that also included fitness coach Rui Faria, goalkeeping coach Silvino Louro and chief scout André Villas-Boas that followed the young manager from FC Porto to Chelsea.

Brito also specialised in audio-visual work to prepare the team for matches. As Mourinho left the Premier League side early into 2007–08, so did his entire staff. On 5 June 2010, he was appointed head coach at C.F. Os Belenenses in the Portuguese second level, but was sacked the following month before the season had even started.

On 18 May 2013, after a series of poor results, Brito was fired by Grêmio Esportivo Osasco.

On 8 January 2018, Brito became head coach at Union Titus Pétange, a club of the first Luxembourgish league. He left the club in December 2018

On 3 June 2022 Highlanders F.C. announced the appointment of Britto as their senior team' coach.

References

External links
CBF data 

1952 births
Living people
Sportspeople from Recife
Brazilian footballers
Association football defenders
Sport Club do Recife players
Santa Cruz Futebol Clube players
Primeira Liga players
Liga Portugal 2 players
Vitória S.C. players
F.C. Paços de Ferreira players
C.D. Feirense players
Rio Ave F.C. players
Vitória F.C. players
Varzim S.C. players
Brazilian expatriate footballers
Expatriate footballers in Portugal
Brazilian expatriate sportspeople in Portugal
Brazilian football managers
Varzim S.C. managers
C.F. Os Belenenses managers
Al-Ittihad Tripoli managers
Al Dhafra FC managers
Brazilian expatriate football managers
Expatriate football managers in Portugal
Chelsea F.C. non-playing staff